Emac, Emacs or similar may refer to:-

 eMac, a now-discontinued Macintosh desktop computer made by Apple Inc.
 Emergency Management Assistance Compact, a mutual aid agreement between states and territories of the United States, enabling resource sharing during natural and man-made disasters
 Extended metal atom chains (EMACs), molecules that consist of a linear string of directly bonded metal atoms, surrounded by organic ligands
 Emacs, a family of text editors
 EMAC, ethernet media access control
 EMAC, Eastern Maar Aboriginal Corporation, land council for the Eastern Maar people in Victoria, Australia

See also
 Emax (disambiguation)